Higher Ground is an album by jazz organist Johnny Hammond recorded for the Kudu label in 1973.

Reception

The Allmusic site awarded the album 2 stars stating "Some of the arrangements seem, well... arranged, but as soon as Smith kicks in, the groove is established".

The song "Big Sur Suite" has been sampled multiple times including The Beastie Boys "Pass the Mic" and Dr. Dre in "A Nigga Wit a Gun".

Track listing
 "Catch My Soul" (Jack Good, Tony Joe White) - 7:19  
 "Summertime/The Ghetto" (George Gershwin, Ira Gershwin, DuBose Heyward/Donny Hathaway, Leroy Hutson) - 10:06  
 "Higher Ground" (Stevie Wonder) - 10:33  
 "Big Sur Suite" (Johnny "Hammond" Smith) - 9:04

Personnel
Johnny Hammond - organ, electric piano
Wayne Andre, Tony Studd - trombone
Paul Faulise, Alan Raph - bass trombone
Jon Faddis, John Frosk, Alan Rubin - trumpet
Marvin Stamm - trumpet, flugelhorn
Ray Alonge - French horn
Joe Henderson - tenor saxophone
Hank Crawford - alto saxophone (track 4)
Eddie Daniels - clarinet
Romeo Penque - alto flute, oboe
Eli Carmen - bassoon
Bob James - electric piano, organ, mellotron, arranger, conductor
George Benson - guitar (tracks 2-4)
Ron Carter - bass, electric bass
Jack DeJohnette (track 4), Steve Gadd (tracks 1-3) - drums
Phil Kraus, Ralph MacDonald - percussion

Production
 Creed Taylor - producer
 Rudy Van Gelder - engineer

References

Johnny "Hammond" Smith albums
1974 albums
Kudu Records albums
Albums produced by Creed Taylor
Albums recorded at Van Gelder Studio